The Crișul Negru (Black Criș) (Romanian), is a river in western Romania (Transylvania) and south-eastern Hungary (Békés County). The river has its source in the western Apuseni Mountains. It flows through the towns Ștei and Beiuș in Romania. Crossing the border of Hungary the river, now called Fekete-Körös, joins the Fehér-Körös a few kilometres north from Gyula to form the Körös river. Part of the water from the river Crișul Repede is diverted towards the Crișul Negru by the Criș Collector Canal.

Hydronymy
The name of this river comes from earlier Dacian Krísos, which meant "black", making this a doublet (cf. Bulg čer "black", Old Church Slavonic čǐrnǔ, Old Prussian kirsnan, Albanian sorrë "raven") with Romanian negru "black". The upper course, upstream from the confluence with the Crișul Băița, is sometimes called Crișul Poienii.

Towns and villages
The following towns and villages are situated along the Crișul Negru, from source to mouth: Vașcău, Ștei, Rieni, Drăgănești, Tărcaia, Beiuș, Șuncuiuș, Uileacu de Beiuș, Șoimi, Căpâlna, Tinca, Batăr, Avram Iancu, Zerind in Romania, and Sarkad in Hungary.

Tributaries
The following rivers are tributaries to the Crișul Negru (from source to mouth):

Left: Criștior, Pârâul Țarinii, Briheni, Valea Mare (Cusuiuș), Tărcăița, Finiș, Căldărești, Șerpoasa, Valea Mare (Șuncuiș), Arman, Hălgaș, Fieghiu, Poclușa, Crișul Mic, Rătășel, Beliu, Răchest, Teuz
Right: Crișul Nou, Crișul Băița, Valea Neagră, Crăiasa, Crișul Pietros, Talpe, Mizieș, Nimăiești, Ioaniș, Valea Roșie, Prisaca, Săliște, Holod, Pusta, Saraz, Valea Nouă

References

Rivers of Romania
 
Rivers of Bihor County
Rivers of Hungary
International rivers of Europe